Gúdar is a municipality located in the province of Teruel, Aragon, Spain. According to the 2004 census (INE), the municipality had a population of 80 inhabitants.

This town gives its name to the Sierra de Gúdar, one of the main ranges of the Iberian System.

References 

Municipalities in the Province of Teruel